Ummu Syaikhah Stacy binti Anam (born 18 August 1990), known professionally as Stacy, is a Malaysian singer, composer, songwriter who rose to fame after winning the sixth season of Akademi Fantasia, receiving 43% of over 3.8 million votes. Her debut album, Aku Stacy, was released on 9 March 2009. She's also known as  Dancing Queen of Malaysia, and has been cited as Ratu Pop. As a composer and lyricist, she is known as  Bunga Cantik.

Early life 
Stacy was born in Kota Kinabalu to  Anam Bayar and Agnes Kaloos. She began her studies at SRK St. Joseph, then to St. Michael's Secondary School, Penampang. Due to her family's financial problem, she had no choice but to drop out of school at the age of 16 when she was in Secondary 4. To support her family, she became a singer in local clubs.

Prior to her audition for AF6, Stacy tried out for other notable singing reality shows, such as One in a Million 1, and also Gang Starz in which she teamed up with her brother, Camellus De'lleli Anam, to form a group named E-voke. However, she only made it to the semi-finals before they were booted out. Her decision to audition for AF6 was derived from her mother's suggestion as soon as she turned 18.

Stacy was also given a full scholarship to continue her studies in Limkokwing University Of Creative Technology. She studied in Diploma of Music and Art, and began her first semester in February 2010.

Musical career

Akademi Fantasia 

Stacy competed against thirteen other contestants to win Season 6 of Akademi Fantasia. The judging panel often harbours her performances with praises every week for being consistent, which implied her as the front-runner of the season. Ramli M.S., the academy principal of AF6 complimented Stacy as a loyal student who is very serious in learning something new. According to him, Stacy is always focus during each lesson and applied all the lessons that she learned during her performances on stage. Throughout the competition, Stacy remained at top three when the voting session was closed at the end of every concert, with four collective highest votes. Before the finale concert, three out of four media reporters predicted her to be the winner of the show. At the end of the finale, the prediction came true when she was crowned as the sixth winner of the show, beating four other students, with a vote of 43%.

2008–2010: Aku Stacy 
Stacy's coronation song "Aku Stacy" was released immediately after her win and it became a huge success. The song quickly became her first number one single in Carta Era for two weeks, as well as topping Carta 30 Era at number one. It stayed in the chart for 22 weeks, making its own history as one of the songs that stayed in the chart for a long period of time. The single also entered Muzik FM chart at number 9. The song slowly climbed to top the chart at No. 1, making it as Stacy's first No. 1 single in the chart. In Hot FM 30, the song only managed to peak at number 14 before finally dropping out from the chart. In Muzik Muzik, it peaked at No. 3.

Following the successful release of her first single, Stacy's own show "Aku Stacy" was launched in Astro Ria. The show featured her journey in the entertainment industry after her win. In the meantime, her first compilation live album, The Best of Stacy was released in September 2008 which featured all of her ten performances in Akademi Fantasia, excluding the fifth concert. The album was well-received as it sold thousand copies in the first week.

In December 2008, the song "Aku Stacy" made it to the final round of Anugerah Juara Lagu, an annual award show in Malaysia to honour the best Malay song every year, a rare accomplishment made by newcomers in the industry. Despite her busy schedules to be fully prepared for Anugerah Juara Lagu, Stacy's second single, "Gagap", premiered in the season finale of Sehati Berdansa. The song is commercially successful as it becomes her second single to reach Top 5 in most charts. In Carta Era, the single has peaked at number 2 and was held off by Adam's "Benar-Benar". In Carta Hot Fm, the song debuted at number 17 and went to peak at number 5. The song also entered Carta Muzik FM at number 10, and eventually peaked at number 4. In Carta Muzik Muzik, the second peaked at number 2, being held of by Adam's "Benar-Benar". Along with Nubhan, fellow student of AF6, Stacy was listed fourth in Murai's list of "Most Outstanding Newcomers of 2008".

In February 2009, Stacy was short-listed as the top 5 finalist for three major categories in Anugerah Bintang Popular, namely Most Popular Artiste, Most Popular Female New Artist, as well as Most Popular Female Singer, where she was voted as the Most Popular Female New Artist. Stacy was also given a certificate of recognition by Sabah's Ministry of Sport and Youth (KBS) for her on-going efforts to improve herself as a newcomer in entertainment industry. She was also recognised as Sabah's youth icon and idol in the entertainment industry.

Her debut album, Aku Stacy, was released on 9 March 2009. She worked closely with notable local composers such as Ajai, Audi Mok as well as Edry KRU and Kieran Kuek. Just like the previous winners of Akademi Fantasia, she gets the opportunity to launch her album in her own town which takes place in Kota Kinabalu.

Stacy's third single, "Pakai Buang" was released on 9 May 2009. The song slowly climbs national charts and so far is peaking at No. 5 in Carta Muzik FM. In Carta Muzik Muzik, "Pakai Buang" debuted at number 5 and is currently peaking at No. 4. In June 2009, Stacy was nominated in Shout! Awards 2009 for the category of Popstar Award, in which she won. She was also being nominated in two categories of 2009 Anugerah Planet Muzik, which are Best Vocal Performance in a Song for New Female Artiste as well as Most Popular Malaysian Artiste which was won by Siti Nurhaliza by only 1%. Stacy was voted second.

Astro Mania! 
In March 2011, Stacy participated in Astro Mania! contest where Malaysia's established singers compete amongst themselves to be crowned the Superstar. Stacy was selected by M. Nasir to join his red team. She remained at Top 5 every week in the competition until the finals. She ended up as runner-up winning RM250,000.

2013: Stay-C 
Her second album, entitled Stay-C was released on 9 September 2011. The album contains eight new songs, with the lead radio single, Kisah Dongeng. The album is produced by Astro and distributed by Warner Music Malaysia.

On 11 November 2011, Stacy's new single "Kasanova" was officially launched with behind the scenes footage, special acoustics performances and the world premiere of Kasanova music video.

"Pelangi Senja" was released as the third single from Stay-C. The song was a commercial success, peaking atop Hot.fm and Muzik Muzik charts. The ballad showcased Stacy's versatile vocals, with critics praising her vocal performance in the song. The song was also hailed at No.2 as the most popular song in Malaysia in 2012. Stacy managed to get to the final of the 27th Anugerah Juara Lagu. The video was released in July 2012.

2014–2016: #1 
The success of her final single from Stay-C, "Bosan" is proven when the song managed to compete in the grand final of AJL28 in January 2014. It was her fifth time competing in the final round of the most prestigious musical event in Malaysia. Her performance was received with mixed reviews by critics.

Stacy's third album, #1 was released on 17 May 2014 at Zouk KL. The album contains 10 songs, including the single, "Gilalah" and the collaboration with Indonesian boyband, SM*SH, "Hello". The album has 2 CDs, whereby CD2 features remix version of the songs. Besides Malaysia, the album was released in Singapore, Indonesia and Brunei. The album proved Stacy's artistry as she was involved directly in the making of the album from the beginning to the end.

Stacy proved herself once again as a consistent artist when her first single "Gilalah" made it to the final of AJL29 in 2015. "Gilalah" was a commercial success, having been played on the mainstream radios such as ERA.fm and Hot.fm every so often. It was the first song where Stacy was involved in making the lyrics totally. The video of the single was directed by herself and first showed exclusively on MeleTop.

In September 2014, Stacy released the video of "Patah" a promotional single from the album. Despite the solid vocal performance, the song failed to crack the radio charts.

Stacy made a triumphant comeback to the music and radio charts with her third single, "Not For Sale" featuring Malaysian famous rapper Altimet, which charted highly on most radio charts, as well as topping the Muzik-Muzik charts. "Not For Sale" also became a soundtrack for Malay popular drama "Tuan Anas Mikael". The accompanying music video was released on 4 August 2015. The song also brought Stacy to her 7th AJL appearance in January 2016. Although she was sick a day before her performance, she wowed the audiences with her vocals and moves.

It is confirmed that Stacy would release a new single entitled "Romeo" in December 2015. The single was later released on 30 January 2016. Her husband, Akim wrote the song for her. After her marriage with Akim, she released a song called "Bila-Bila" which discusses her love for her husband. The song was released on Team Sangat Gila Stacy channel on YouTube on 22 October 2016. Stacy later took a break from music due to pregnancy and taking care of her family.

2017-present: "Cakap Ke Tangan", Rhyme & Rhythm Music Entertainment (R&R) and venture into song-writing
After about a year hiatus, Stacy released her new dance-pop single titled "Cakap Ke Tangan" on 25 August 2017. The song is written by her husband, Akim Ahmad and Laq. The official music video for the single was released on 13 October 2017 and is directed by Casper, whom she works with for "Not For Sale" video.

In July 2018, Stacy announced that she is not renewing her contract with her management company, Rocketfuel Entertainment. She has been with the company since her Akademi Fantasia debut in 2008. She also announced that she has set up her own talent management company, Rhyme & Rhythm Music Entertainment with husband, Akim.

Stacy ventured into song-writing, under the pseudonym "Bunga Cantik" with the release of single "Rampas" that was popularized by Akim & The Majistret in August 2018. She wrote her second single, "Khayal" which was released on 12 July 2019.  On February 14, 2020, Akim and Stacy again created a duet to their fans named " Aku Kau dan Muzik" with their own creation and Freddy HyperAct.  This song has been accepted by fans as the melody and lyrics are very interesting and profound for the couple in love. 

In 2022 at the 36th Anugerah Juara Lagu grand final night, Stacy for the first time won an award at the prestigious event. Her song Cinta by Marsha Milan created by her as a composer with Akim Ahmad was recognized as the second best song at the AJL 36. This is the first time for Stacy to won an award respectively at the Anugerah Juara Lagu because previously she had competed 7 times at the event as a singer but failed to win any awards.

Discography

Studio albums

Singles

Aidilfitri song 
 Salam Lebaran with Hot FM announcer 2011, Shila, Faizal Tahir, Shahir, Akim, Black, Hafiz, Ayu, Tomok and Mawi (Hangatnya Raya Hot FM)
 Bunga Api Di Hati with Fara Fauzana, Shila and Sharifah Aleya (Hangatnya Raya Hot FM)

Collaborations

Soundtracks 
 "Raya Datang Lagi" – Rumah Baru, Bini Baru, Baru Raya (Astro Prima Aidilfitri Special) (2008)
 "Rasa-rasa Cinta" – Sayang You Can Dance OST (2009)
 "Menggegar Dunia" – My Spy OST (2009)
 "Primadona" – My Spy OST (2009)
 "Kisah Kita" – K.I.T.A. (drama series) (2010)
 "Kata Kau" – Kata Kau (Astro Ria gameshow) (2010)
 "Lihatlah Dunia" – Dottie (drama series) (2010)
 "Jahatnya Cinta" (with Akim) – for the 'Say it with Cornetto Style' campaign (2011).
 "Gilalah" – Aku Mahu Superbibik. (Telemovie Astro Ceria) (2014).
 "Not For Sale" – Tuan Anas Mikhael. (Drama Series Astro Ria) (2015).
 "Khayal" – Demi Rindumu. (Drama Series TV3) (2019).

Personal life 
Stacy was previously a Roman Catholic Christian before embracing Islam in August 2015 to marry her love, and chose Ummu Syaikhah Stacy binti Anam as her Muslim name. Stacy married Malaysian singer-songwriter Akim Ahmad in Kota Kinabalu, Sabah in 2016. On 17 February 2017, the couple welcomed their first child, a daughter named Eshaal. On 6 August 2022 they also welcomed their second child, a son named Isa. They are blessed with three children including an adopted child Bella Deluna.

Filmography

Awards and nominations

Endorsements 
Stacy is currently the ambassador for Clinelle (a skin care product), Cornetto, SilkyGirl and Intimate. In 2013, she was appointed as Drive M7 (an energy drink) ambassador, together with Aaron Aziz and Fizo Omar. Stacy also appears in Kit Kat and Digi advertisements along with her husband, Akim Ahmad. Stacy was a spokesperson for BOH Tea (2009), Power Root-Ali Cafe (2009), Canon Malaysia (2009) and Corntoz Mamee Double-Decker (2009).

Since 2017, Stacy is one of the spokesperson for Anlene. She's also a spokesperson for Maggi Cukup Rasa seasoning from Maggi brand.

References

External links 

 

1990 births
Living people
Malaysian pop rock singers
Malaysian women pop singers
Malaysian television personalities
Kadazan-Dusun people
People from Sabah
Converts to Islam from Roman Catholicism
Singing talent show winners
Malay-language singers
Akademi Fantasia winners
Warner Music Group artists
Malaysian rhythm and blues singers
21st-century Malaysian women singers